South Middleton can refer to:

 South Middleton, Greater Manchester, a ward of Rochdale Borough Council, England
 South Middleton, Ilderton, a location in Northumberland, England
 South Middleton, Wallington Demesne, a former civil parish, now in Wallington Demesne, Northumberland, England
 South Middleton, Ontario, Canada
 South Middleton Township, Pennsylvania, USA

See also
 Middleton (disambiguation)
 North Middleton (disambiguation)
 West Middleton